Muhamad Kamil Akmal bin Abd Halim (born 14 February 1999) is a Malaysian professional footballer who plays as a right-back for the Malaysia Super League club Kedah Darul Aman.

Club career
Originally from Jitra, Kedah, Kamil was in Kedah Darul Aman's youth team before being promoted to the first team in 2022.

Career statistics

Club

References

External links
 

1999 births
Living people
People from Kedah
Malaysian footballers
Association football defenders
Kedah Darul Aman F.C. players
Malaysia Super League players